Rafael López Nussa (22 February 1885 – 3 March 1943) was a Puerto Rican physician and public servant.  In 1916 López Nussa performed the first heart surgery operation in Puerto Rico.

Early years
López Nussa was born in Mayaguez, Puerto Rico, on 22 February 1885. He was the son of Ramon B. López, an Austrian,
  and Micaela Nussa, a Spaniard from Barcelona. Rafael López Nussa was the brother of María Asunción, who married Bailey K. Ashford.

Education
After completing his schooling years and graduating from high school in Puerto Rico, López Nussa entered college and graduated with a degree in medicine from Georgetown University in 1906. He graduated with specialization from the New York Post Graduate Medical School in 1913, and from the Chicago Laboratory of Surgical Technique in 1916.

Career
He returned to Puerto Rico and performed as medical director at the Hospital Tricoche in Ponce from 1907 to 1920. He represented Puerto Rico at the International Congress for Medicine in London in 1913.  In 1916 he performed a delicate cardiac surgical procedure at Hospital Tricoche in Ponce; it is so registered in the records of the Puerto Rico Medical Association as the first such procedure performed in Puerto Rico.

In 1918 he took a position at the Hospital San Lucas as surgeon and medical director.  He was also a surgeon at Ponce's Hospital de Distrito, a public government institution serving south-central Puerto Rico, and was also a medical consultant for the new Escuela de Medicina Tropical in San Juan, Puerto Rico.

Political and other activities
In 1915, Lopez Nussa was one of the co-founders of the Puerto Rico National Guard. In 1928, he was president of Ponce School Board. He was also president of the Ponce Rotary Club, vice-president of the Puerto Rico Medical Association, member of the American Board of Surgeons, and the physician for the Ponce Firefighters Corps. In 1930, he presided over the medical group that traveled to the Dominican Republic to care for victims of San Zenon tropical storm. In 1934, Lopez Nussa formed part of the welcoming committee for the arrival of U.S. President Franklin Delano Roosevelt and his wife to Ponce.

Death
López Nussa, died in San Juan on 3 March 1943. He was buried at the Santa María Magdalena de Pazzis Cemetery.

Legacy
 There is a public housing developments in Ponce named after Lopez Nussa. 
 He is also recognized as one of Ponce's notable physicians at the Park of the Illustrious Ponce Citizens. 
 In San Juan, the municipal hospital is named in his honor.  
 In Ponce, there is also a school named in his memory.

See also

 List of Puerto Ricans

References

1885 births
1943 deaths
Burials at Santa María Magdalena de Pazzis Cemetery
People from Mayagüez, Puerto Rico
Physicians from Ponce
Georgetown University alumni
New York University Grossman School of Medicine alumni
University of Illinois Urbana-Champaign alumni